The 2013 Valparaiso Crusaders football team represented Valparaiso University in the 2013 NCAA Division I FCS football season. They were led by fourth-year head coach Dale Carlson and played their home games at Brown Field. They were a member of the Pioneer Football League. They finished the season 1–10, 1–7 in PFL play to finish in a tie for ninth place.

Assistant coach Mike Gravier was promoted to interim head coach for the final game of the season when head coach Carlson was fired.  At the end of the season, Dave Cecchini was hired as a full-time replacement.

Schedule

References

Valparaiso
Valparaiso Beacons football seasons
Valparaiso Crusaders football